Nottingham High School may refer to:
 Nottingham High School in Nottingham, United Kingdom
 Nottingham Girls' High School in Nottingham, United Kingdom
 Nottingham High School (New Jersey) in Hamilton Township, Mercer County, New Jersey, United States
 Nottingham High School (New York) in Syracuse, New York, United States
 High School tram stop on the Nottingham Express Transit
 Nottingham Community Access and Job Training School in St. Louis, Missouri, United States